Hariharan Pilla Happy Aanu is a 2003 Indian Malayalam-language comedy film directed by Vishwanathan, starring Mohanlal and Jyothirmayi. This was Vishwanathan's directorial debut, and the first film for Stephen Devassy as composer.

Plot

Hariharan Pillai runs a construction company with his uncle Velappan. He construct a house for the rich money lender Sathyapalan who does not compensate then after completing the house. Sathyapalan's daughter Kavya who initially dislikes Hariharan Pillai. However she eventually fall love for him. Hari also has to take care of his sister Latha who is in love with Nikhil. How Hariharan Pillai sorts out all of this issues and gets Kavya form the rest of the story.

Cast 
Mohanlal as Hariharan Pillai
Jyothirmayi as Kavya
C. I. Paul as Satyapalan
Vijayaraghavan as Dilip
Cochin Haneefa as Velappan
Jagathy as Mason Vasu alias Anjilithekkethil Vasudevan Namboothiri
Salim Kumar as Sundaran

Production 
The bike with unusual wheels that was featured in C.I.D. Moosa (2003) was featured in this film.

Soundtrack 
The music was composed by debutante Stephen Devassy, who took a sabbatical after working on this film. Newcomer Rajeev Alunkal wrote all the lyrics. Alunkal recalled in a 2015 interview that it was risky for a newcomer to pen all the lyrics and how the producer of the film, Johnny Sagarika, took that risk.

Release and reception 
The film released shortly after Mohanlal's box office success Balettan (2003) and Jyothirmayi's Anyar (2003). The film released in November 2003 coinciding with Ramadan. Abhijath of The Hindu opined that "The film begins well, while in the second half, it loses tempo". To prevent piracy, the film was released in 50 centres. Sagarika dropped his shelved project Chakram with Mohanlal and Dileep after the film's failure. Mohanlal went on to play a similar role in Vamanapuram Bus Route (2004), which was almost removed from theatres due to the box office failure of this film.

References

External links 

2000s Malayalam-language films
2003 comedy films
2003 directorial debut films
Indian comedy films